Makars' Court is a courtyard in central Edinburgh, Scotland. It forms part of Lady Stair's Close, which connects the Lawnmarket with The Mound to the north, and is next to the Writers' Museum. Described as an "evolving national literary monument", the courtyard incorporates quotations from Scottish literature inscribed onto paving slabs. The quotations represent works in the languages used by Scots past and present: Gaelic, Scots, English, and Latin.

Selection
The Scots language term makar denotes an author or writer, though stressing their role as a "skilled and versatile worker in the craft of writing". Since 2002 the city of Edinburgh has appointed its own official Makar.

In 1997, twelve Scottish writers were selected by the Saltire Society, and quotations from their works were inscribed on stone slabs installed in the area adjacent to the museum. The first was unveiled by Ronald Harwood, then president of International PEN, and the rest by poet Iain Crichton Smith. Further inscriptions continue to be added to the Court.

List of makars commemorated

References

External links
 Makars' Court, Edinburgh Museums and Galleries
 The Makars Literary Tour

 
Buildings and structures in Edinburgh
Royal Mile
Tourist attractions in Edinburgh